Swanland is a village and civil parish in the East Riding of Yorkshire in England.

Geography
The village is distinct from other settlements in the area, separated by fields. To the east are the townships of West Ella, Willerby and Anlaby; to the south-east Hessle and to the south-west North Ferriby.

The civil parish of Swanland is surrounded by the parishes of North Ferriby, Welton, Skidby, Kirk Ella, and Hessle to the south, west, north, north-east and east respectively, with the A63 road forming part of the southern boundary, Melton Bottom road the western boundary, and the A164 approximating to the eastern boundary.

Swanland offers fine views of the surrounding countryside, particularly across the Humber Estuary, as has been noted historically.

According to the 2011 UK census, Swanland parish had a population of 3,802, an increase on the 2001 UK census figure of 3,688.

Swanland lies within the Parliamentary constituency of Haltemprice and Howden.

The village

Swanland village forms a significant part of the civil parish, and is the only place of note within the parish. Near the centre of the village are a pond, as well as library (East Riding of Yorkshire Council operated), school (Swanland Primary School) and public house. Swanland has a village hall, operating as a registered charity. The B1231 road passes through the village.

There are two churches in the village: St Barnabas is the Church of England Parish Church; and Christ Church, also known as 'The Church by the Pond', is a Methodist / United Reformed Church.

History
There is evidence of human activity and habitation in the area around Swanland dating to the British Iron Age/Roman Britain period.

Swanland is not mentioned in the Domesday Survey, though a chapel existed in the medieval period, in the 12th century or earlier, and a Hall, is thought to have been sited at Swanland from at least the 13th century, when it was the residence of Eustace de Vesci. In the later medieval period (16th) the Hall was the residence of the Haldenby family. By the late 18th century the Hall was no longer extant.

During the 18th and 19th centuries Swanland, together with other villages west of Hull, became a popular place for wealthy residents of Hull to relocate. Large houses in Swanland included 
Swanland Hall (built after 1740), Braffords Hall (built after 1778), Swanland House (built 1796, rebuilt ), and Swanland Manor (built 1848, demolished 1935).

The Congregationalist church, 'Christ Church' was built in 1804, with porches added in the 1840s, and a Primitive Methodist chapel built in 1828. In 1831 Swanland had a population of 418. At the mid 19th century Swanland was essentially a  linear settlement along the east–west Mill Lane/Main Street, with the larger halls and manor houses set back from the road in the surrounding land. Outside the village the landscape was rural, enclosed fields, with small scale chalk extraction from pits.

A school was built 1876, next to the pond. The original church of St Barnabas was built in 1899, established as a "mission room" for the parish of All Saints' North Ferriby.

In 1914 an Institute was built, containing a billiards room and library, funded by Sir James Reckitt. During the 1920s and 30s the village expanded again as a commuter village. Electricity was first supplied to the village in 1929 (with street lighting installed 1954). A large  circular concrete water tower was built in 1931 by Hull Corporation, replacing an earlier tower built in the 1890s.

Outside the village a large chalk pit was dug in the mid 20th century in the southeast corner of the parish (Humberfield Quarry, disused by the 1980s and subsequently filled in).

Initial post war housing development consisted of prefabs. Further house building took place in the 1960s, 70s, 80s, and 90s. The population rose steadily from 1,212 in 1951 to around 4,000 in 1998.

In 1992 a new St Barnabas church was built to replace the 1899 church, with a large integrated hall and conference facilities. The 'new' church was the first new Anglican Church to be built in the Diocese of York for over 50 years, and was funded primarily by sacrificial giving from members of the congregation under the visionary leadership of first Rev Mike Lowe and then Rev Richard Hill. The church is open 7 days a week, hosting a variety of community groups (Brownies, U3A, etc.) as well as numerous church activities open to all, including a popular parent and toddler group "Cygnets", fortnightly group walks, a weekly coffee morning, collecting for foodbanks, a senior citizens' exercise group, etc.)  The church also hosts 2 thriving Sunday congregations who are actively involved in serving the local community through a lively children's church most Sundays, a healthy youth group and a variety of small groups for all from 11 to 111. Swanland became a separate ecclesiastical parish in 1995.

See also
Swanland was formerly twinned with the village of Lestrem in Northern France. The twinning arrangement came to an end in the mid-2010s due to a general lack of interest across the village.

References

Sources

Literature

External links

Villages in the East Riding of Yorkshire
Civil parishes in the East Riding of Yorkshire